Slí na Sláinte (meaning "Path of health"), abbreviated SnaS, is an initiative developed by the Irish Heart Foundation, with the aim to encourage and increase the number of people walking in the Republic of Ireland. It provides an easy accessible and inexpensive environment for regular exercise for walkers throughout the country.

Yellow signs on blue poles are placed at one-kilometre intervals along each established walking route. These signs allows walkers to keep track of how far they walk and the signs are not numbered so walkers can start and finish at whatever point they like.

Trained walking leaders promote and lead walks in their area, and run the "Slí Challenge" to help people calculate their time and distance walked to help them achieve awards when targets are met.

Slí na Sláinte has grown to include a network of almost one hundred and fifty walking routes around Ireland, and the programme has been introduced in ten countries worldwide.

Gallery

External links

Irish Heart Foundation - Slí na Sláinte
Irish Citizens Information - Slí na Sláinte
South Dublin County Council - Slí na Sláinte
Fáilte Ireland - Slí na Sláinte in the West

Health in the Republic of Ireland
Walking
Health campaigns